Lifer is the ninth studio album from contemporary Christian music band MercyMe, which was released on March 31, 2017, by Fair Trade Services. The album was produced by David Garcia, Ben Glover and Solomon Olds.

The album debuted at No. 1 on the Billboard Christian Album chart and No. 10 on the Billboard 200 chart, selling 33,000 album equivalent units in its first week. The lead single from the album, "Even If", reached No. 1 on the Billboard Christian Songs chart, becoming their twelfth No. 1 on the chart.

Commercial performance
For the Billboard charting week of April 22, 2017, Lifer debuted at No. 10 on the Billboard 200. It also reached No. 1 on the Top Christian Albums chart. The album sold 33,000 album equivalent units in its first week, 30,000 of which are pure sales.

Track listing

Personnel 
Credits taken from AllMusic.

MercyMe
 Bart Millard – lead vocals, backing vocals 
 Barry Graul – guitars
 Mike Scheuchzer – guitars
 Nathan Cochran – bass guitar, upright bass
 Robby Shaffer – drums

Additional musicians
 David Garcia – keyboards, programming, guitars 
 Ben Glover – keyboards, programming, guitars, backing vocals 
 Solomon Olds – keyboards, programming, backing vocals 
 Fred Williams – keyboards, programming
 Bryon "Mr. Talkbox" Chambers – clavinet
 Dan Michaels – tenor saxophone 
 Rob Adams – trombone, horn arrangements 
 Joshua Harner – trumpet 
 Nick Haynes – trumpet 
 Joe Murphy – tuba 
 Willy Johnson – backing vocals
 John Reuben – guest vocals (3)

Production 
 David Garcia – producer, engineer 
 Ben Glover – producer, engineer 
 Solomon Olds – producer 
 Buckley Miller – engineer 
 Ben Phillips – engineer 
 Paul Rossetti – engineer 
 Mark Endert – mixing 
 Sean Moffitt – mixing 
 Dana Salsedo – creative direction 
 Brody Harper – art direction 
 Nick DePartee – artwork, design
 David Molnar – photography

Charts

Certifications

References

2017 albums
MercyMe albums
Fair Trade Services albums